Michael Patrick (born September 9, 1944) is a retired American sportscaster, known for his long tenure with ESPN.

Early career
Patrick began his broadcasting career in the fall of 1966 at WVSC-Radio in Somerset, Pennsylvania. In 1970, he was named Sports Director at WJXT-TV in Jacksonville, Florida, where he provided play-by-play for Jacksonville Sharks' World Football League (WFL) telecasts (1973–74). He also called Jacksonville University basketball games on both radio and television.

From 1975 until 1982, he worked for WJLA-TV as a sports reporter and weekend anchor. During this period, Patrick also did play-by-play for Maryland Terrapins football and basketball broadcasts as well as pre-season games for the Washington Redskins when WJLA had the TV rights to broadcast those games.

ESPN

Beginning in 1982, Patrick worked for ESPN, where he is best known for his role as play-by-play announcer on the network's Sunday Night Football telecasts, with Paul Maguire and Joe Theismann from 1987–2005. Patrick was briefly replaced in 2004 by Pat Summerall, while he recovered from heart bypass surgery.

He has also called college football, men's and women's college basketball, and the College World Series for the network, as well as several NFL playoff games for ABC Sports while the network held the Monday Night Football television package.

In 2006, Patrick became the lead play-by-play announcer for ESPN on College Football Primetime, along with Todd Blackledge and field reporter Holly Rowe. In July 2009, ESPN announced that Patrick would begin calling Saturday afternoon ESPN/ABC college football for the 2009 college football season, which he did through 2017.

In addition, Patrick called the NCAA Women's Division I Basketball Championship from 1996 through 2009 and the College World Series in Omaha, Nebraska from 2003 until 2014.

On February 21, 2018, Patrick retired from ESPN after 35 years with the network.

Non ESPN-related assignments

Patrick also did play-by-play of Atlantic Coast Conference (ACC) football and basketball games for Jefferson-Pilot (now Lincoln Financial Sports) between 1984 and 1986.

Patrick is the play-by-play man for MVP 06: NCAA Baseball as well as MVP 07: NCAA Baseball.

For 2015, 2016 and 2017, Patrick did play-by-play for the Cleveland Browns preseason football games.

Patrick resides in northern Virginia with his wife, Janet.

References

1944 births
Living people
American television sports announcers
College baseball announcers in the United States
Women's college basketball announcers in the United States
College basketball announcers in the United States
College football announcers
George Washington University alumni
Maryland Terrapins men's basketball announcers
Maryland Terrapins football announcers
National Football League announcers
People from Clarksburg, West Virginia
World Football League announcers
Journalists from West Virginia
Television anchors from Jacksonville, Florida